FNC Entertainment (stands for "fish and cake") is a South Korean entertainment company established in 2006 by South Korean singer and record producer Han Seong-ho. The label operates as a record label, talent agency, music production company, event management and concert production company, and music publishing house. The label previously known as FNC Music, only managed musicians but later changed its name to FNC Entertainment in 2012 and began to broaden their business field of entertainment. It has since January 2012, been based in its own company offices in Cheongdam-dong.

The name is based on the miracle of feeding the multitude using only five loaves and the two fish. This is because Han Seong-ho is a devout Christian, he uses the name to hope for more miracles happen for the company.

The label is home to prominent musical artists such as rock bands F.T. Island, CNBLUE and N.Flying, and K-pop groups AOA, SF9, Cherry Bullet (under the sub-label FNC W) and P1Harmony. It also manages a number of entertainers, including Lee Guk-joo and Lee Se-young, and a number of actors, including Jung Hae-in, Lee Dong-gun, Park Gwang-hyun, Sung Hyuk, Kim Won-hee, and Kim Yeon-seo.

In February 2021, FNC created two new sub-labels.  The first label, FNC B, is a joint venture between FNC Entertainment and HOW Entertainment, which focuses on Trot music.  The second label, FNC W, specializes on the management of their girl groups.

Artists

Korea

Recording artists

Soloists 

 Hong-gi (F.T. Island)
  Yonghwa (CNBLUE)
 J.Don (N.Flying)

Groups 

 F.T. Island
 CNBLUE 
 AOA
 N.Flying
 SF9
 P1Harmony

Sub-units & Project Groups 

 F.T. Triple
 AOA Cream
 Romantic J 
 Two Song Place 
 JNJ

FNC W 

 Cherry Bullet

Actors and Actresses 

 Baek Zu Ho
 Cha Hun
 Choi Min Hwan
 Choi Yu Ju
 David Silver
 Heo Ji Won
 Jin Seo Yul
 Jin Ye Ju
 Jung Hae In
 Jung Yong Hwa
 Kang Chani
 Kang Min Hyuk
 Kim Bo Ra
 Kim Hwi Young
 Kim Inseong
 Kim Jae Hyun
 Kim Nu Ri
 Kim Ro Woon
 Kim Seo Ha
 Kim Seo Yeon
 Kim Young Bin
 Lee Chae Yun
 Lee Da Won
 Lee Dong Gun
 Lee Hong Gi
 Lee Jae Jin
 Lee Jae Yoon
 Lee Jung Shin
 Lee Seung Hyub
 Im Do-hwa
 Lim Hyoun Soo
 Moon Seong Hyun
 Park Chae Rin
 Park Hyun Jung
 Park Ji Ahn
 Park Ji Won
 Seo Dong Sung
 Shin Hye Jeong
 Shin Ian
 Shin Yi June
 Sung Hyuk
 Yoo Tae Yang

Entertainers 

 Choe Seong-min
 Jo Woo-jong
 Lee Hyung-taik
 Lee Guk-joo
 Moon Ji-ae
 Moon Se-yoon
 Noh Hong-chul
 Yoo Jae-pil

Japan

FNC Entertainment Japan 

 Prikil

Former artists

Former recording artists

 M Signal
 F.T. Island Oh Won-bin (2007–2009) Choi Jong-hoon (2007–2019) Song Seung-hyun (2009–2019)
 Juniel (2011–2016)
 CNBLUE Lee Jong-hyun (2009–2019)
 AOA Park Cho-a (2012–2019) Kwon Mina (2012–2019) Seo Yu-na (2012–2021) Shin Ji-min (2012–2022)Kim Seol-hyun (2012–2022)
 AOA Black Youkyung (2012–2016)
 N.Flying Kwon Kwang-jin (2013–2018)
 Honeyst (2017–2019)
 Cherry Bullet Mirae (2019) Kokoro (2019) Linlin (2019)
 Innovator

Former actors and actresses

 Jo Jae-yoon (2014–2019)
 Jung Jin-young (2015-2022)
 Jung Eugene (2018-2022)
 Jung Hye-sung (2015–2018)
 Jung Woo (2015–2019)
 Kim Min-seo (2014–2017)
 Kwak Dong-yeon (2012–2020)
 Kwon Mina (2012–2019)
 Lee Da-hae (2014–2016)
 Lee Elijah (2016–2017)
 Park Doo-sik (2016–2019)
 Yoon Jin-seo (2012–2020)
 Han Eun-seo
 Kim Chul-min
 Kwon Da-hyun
 Lee Hae-woo
 Lee Seung-joo
 Park Gwang-hyun

Former entertainers

 Ji Suk-jin (2015–2016)
 Song Eun-i (2012–2019)
 Lee Se-young (2017–2019)
 Yoo Jae-suk (2015–2021)
 Kim Ah-yoon
 Jeong Hyeong-don
 Kim Yong-man

Discography

Filmography

Drama

Variety

Film

Ownership
As of June 2016, FNC Entertainment's stocks are owned by the following individuals and/or companies:

Subsidiaries

 FNC Academy
 SM Life Design Group (formerly FNC Add Culture, acquired in 2016; acquired by SM Entertainment in 2018)
 Film Boutique (acquired in 2017; acquired by HB Entertainment ko in 2019 )
 Genie Pictures (acquired in 2018)
 FNC Entertainment Japan
 FNC Global Training Center
 Love FNC Foundation (official CSR arm)
 FNC Story
 FNC B (joint venture with HOW Entertainment)
 FNC W
 FNC Investment

References

External links

 

 Official Naver 

 
Companies listed on KOSDAQ
Record labels established in 2006
Music companies of South Korea
Music publishing companies of South Korea
Television production companies of South Korea
South Korean record labels
K-pop record labels
Rock record labels
Talent agencies of South Korea
Labels distributed by Kakao M
Labels distributed by Warner Music Group